Neipu Township is a rural township in Pingtung County, Taiwan.

Geography
 Area: 
 Population: 52,357 (February 2023)

Administrative divisions
The township comprises 23 villages: Ailiao, Daxin, Fengtian, Futian, Hexing, Jianxing, Laobei, Liming, Longquan, Longtan, Meihe, Neipu, Neitian, Shangshu, Shuimen, Tungning, Tungpian, Tungshi, Xingnan, Yiting, Zhenfeng, Zhonglin and Zhuwei.

Education
 Meiho University
 National Pingtung University of Science and Technology
 Nei-Pu Elementary School

Tourist attractions
 Liudui Hakka Cultural Park

Notable natives
 Wu Pao-chun, baker

References

External links

 Neipu Township Office 

Townships in Pingtung County